Les Pontets is a commune in the Doubs department in the Bourgogne-Franche-Comté region in eastern France.

Geography
It is dominated by the Haute Joux, with the peaks of Turchet (1227 m) and Saint Sorlin (1237 m), from which there is a view of the Alps.

Population

See also
 Communes of the Doubs department

References

External links

 Les Pontets on the intercommunal Web site of the department 

Communes of Doubs